Count Ferenc Széchényi de Sárvár-Felsővidék (28 April 1754 in Fertőszéplak – 13 December 1820 in Vienna) was a Hungarian nobleman and statesman, known for founding the Hungarian National Library and the National Museum in Budapest. The library is today named the National Széchényi Library after him.

Life

Early life 
He was born on 28 April 1754 as the sixth child of Count Zsigmond Széchényi (1720–1769), a captain of the hussars and Imperial and Royal Chamberlain and his wife Countess Mária Cziráky of Cirák and Dénesfalva (1724–1787). His godparents were Doctor Ádám Groff and his wife Katalin Khellesz. He had an older brother and three sisters who all married into prominent Austro-Hungarian noble families.

Marriage and issue
On 17.8.1777 in Kópháza Count Ferenc married Countess Julia Festetics de Tolna (1753-1824). He was the father of six children and Count István Széchenyi was one of them.

References 
m

Hungarian philanthropists
Ferenc Szechenyi
1820 deaths
1754 births
Museum founders
Knights of the Golden Fleece of Austria